Hobart Mills is a former settlement in Nevada County, California.

The town is named after Walter Scott Hobart, Sr. who operated a sawmill in the area since 1897.  Hobart was a leading lumberman in the Lake Tahoe district from the 1860s until his death in 1892.

There was a post office in the town during the period of 1900 through 1938.

The politician Patrick J. Hillings was born in Hobart Mills.

References

Nevada County, California
Former populated places in California